The Historic Synagogue Justo Sierra 71 or Synaguoge Nidjei Israel is an old Ashkenazi synagogue in Mexico City. The building serves both as a synagogue and cultural center of the Jewish community in the historic center of Mexico City (Spanish: Centro Histórico de la Ciudad de México). It was constructed in 1941.

History
This religious site was built for Orthodox Jewish immigrants from Poland, Russia, and Lithuania in La Merced neighborhood. It was the second Ashkenazi synagogue in Mexico City.

Architecture 
The architect Raquel Franklin claims that the building's Torah ark was influenced in its design by that of the synagogue of Shavel (Šiauliai) in Lithuania.

See also
Judaism in Mexico

References

External links 
Historic Synagogue Justo Sierra 71 Official Website

 

Synagogues in Mexico
Buildings and structures in Mexico City
Historic center of Mexico City
Jewish communities in Mexico
Ashkenazi synagogues
Ashkenazi Jewish culture in Mexico
European-Jewish culture in Mexico
Immigration to Mexico
Jews and Judaism in Mexico City
Lithuanian diaspora in North America
Lithuanian-Jewish diaspora
Orthodox synagogues
Orthodox Judaism in North America
Polish diaspora in North America
Polish-Jewish diaspora
Russian diaspora in North America
Russian-Jewish diaspora in North America
1941 establishments in Mexico
Synagogues completed in 1941